Edward Ecclestone (c1647 – 1675) was rector of St Mary’s, Oldswinford in Worcestershire.

Edward Ecclestone was a son of William Ecclestone of Charnock Richard, Lancashire.  He was educated at Lincoln College, Oxford, matriculating on 3 July 1663 at the age of 16.  He was awarded his BA on 24 February 1666.  He died and was buried at Oldswinford on 24 January 1675.

Career
Ecclestone was the household chaplain to Thomas Foley appointed on the recommendation of Richard Baxter.  According to Nash (citing the Register of Bishop Walter Blandford), Foley presented Ecclestone as rector of Oldswinford on 17 May 1673.  Ecclestone corresponded with Baxter about conforming, with the exchanges becoming acrimonious as Ecclestone decided to conform.

Suggested authorship of Noah’s Flood
Edward Ecclestone has been identified as the author of a verse version of Noah's Flood, a sequel to Dryden's The State of Innocence (1677). This work was first published in 1679 with subsequent versions in 1685 and 1690. Although it is possible Noah's Flood was the posthumous publication of Edward Ecclestone of Oldswinford, it is less likely that the subsequent versions could be attributed to his authorship.  The title page describes the author as "Gent".  A second Edward Ecclestone is listed as a graduate of Oxford and is described as "Gent".  (Edward Ecclestone of Oldswinford is described as "pleb".)  There is no evidence to prefer the identification of Edward Ecclestone of Oldswinford as the author of Noah's Flood.

References

See also
 

1675 deaths
17th-century English Anglican priests
Alumni of Lincoln College, Oxford
1647 births